Yekaterinburg Time (YEKT) is the time zone five hours ahead of UTC (UTC+05:00) and 2 hours ahead of Moscow Time (MSK+2).

In 2011, Russia moved to year-round daylight saving time.  Instead of switching between UTC+05:00 in winter and UTC+06:00 in summer, Yekaterinburg time was set to UTC+06:00 until 2014, when it was reset back to UTC+05:00 year-round.

The time zone applies to the Ural Federal District, and Bashkortostan, Orenburg Oblast and Perm Krai in the Volga Federal District.

See also
Time in Russia

References

Time zones
Time in Russia